Hall v. Florida, 572 U.S. 701 (2014), was a United States Supreme Court case in which the Court held that a bright-line IQ threshold requirement for determining whether someone has an intellectual disability (formerly mental retardation) is unconstitutional in deciding whether they are eligible for the death penalty.

The case fleshed out standards first announced by the Court in Atkins v. Virginia, which left the determination of what constitutes intellectual disability to the states. In Atkins, the Court held that people are intellectually disabled and thus ineligible for the death penalty if these three conditions are met: 1.) “subaverage intellectual functioning,” meaning low I.Q. scores; 2.) a lack of fundamental social and practical skills; and 3.) the presence of both conditions before age 18.  The Atkins court stated I.Q. scores under “approximately 70” typically indicate disability, but the court let the states determine who is mentally disabled and thus cannot be executed.

Background 
On February 21, 1978, Freddie Lee Hall and Mark Ruffin committed the rape and murder of Karol Hurst. Hurst was 21-years-old and seven months pregnant. Afterwards, the pair murdered Lonnie Coburn, a sheriff's deputy, when he tried to apprehend them in a parking lot. At his trial, Hall was sentenced to death.

In the 2002 case of Atkins v Virginia, the court ruled that the Eighth Amendment prohibited the execution of the intellectually disabled. After the Atkins ruling, Hall challenged his death sentence on the grounds that he had an intellectual disability. Since his arrest, Hall had received nine I.Q tests, with scores ranging from 60 to 80. There was also significant evidence in school reports and court records of Hall's intellectual disability, a trial judge noted that he had been "mentally retarded his entire life". Hall presented an I.Q score of 71, however, under Florida Law, a person with an I.Q above 70 was not considered mentally retarded. Hall's appeal to the Florida Supreme Court was dismissed, with the court holding that Florida's 70-point threshold was constitutional.

Judgement 
In Hall, the Supreme Court held 5-4 that Florida's interpretation of the threshold requirement was unconstitutional. 

The Court narrowed the discretion under which U.S. states can designate an individual convicted of murder as too intellectually incapacitated to be executed. The Court prohibited states in borderline cases from relying only on intelligence test scores to determine whether a death row inmate is eligible to be executed. States must look beyond IQ scores when inmate tests are in the range of 70 to 75. IQ tests have a margin of error, and those inmates whose scores fall within the margin must be allowed to present other evidence of mental disability. The Court further held that the states may not use a "rigid rule" that denies leniency to defendants with severe mental disabilities simply because they score above 70 on an IQ test. Hall had scored a 71 instead of 70 on an I.Q. test. Justice Anthony M. Kennedy wrote for the majority that this "rigid rule, the court now holds, creates an unacceptable risk that persons with an intellectual disability will be executed, and thus is unconstitutional." If an individual claiming intellectual incapacity has an IQ score that falls somewhere between 70 and 75, then that individual’s lawyers must be allowed to offer additional clinical evidence of intellectual deficit, including, most importantly, the inability to learn basic skills and adapt to changing circumstances.

The court also adopted the term "intellectually disabled" to replace "mentally retarded," which had been used in prior opinions. Intellectual disability is a condition characterized by significant limitations in both intellectual functioning and in adaptive behavior, which covers many everyday social and practical skills, and originates before the age of 18, according to the American Association on Intellectual and Developmental Disabilities, and the term is preferred by the medical profession.

Dissenting judgement 
Justice Alito filed the dissenting opinion, he was joined by Chief Justice Roberts, Justice Scalia and Justice Thomas. In his dissent, Alito criticised the majority's reliance on the views of medical experts, saying that the Justices had overruled Atkins "based largely on the positions adopted by private professional organisations". He also argued that by overruling Atkins, the court had replaced the framework, established in previous Eighth Amendment cases, with a "uniform national rule that is conceptually unsound, and likely to result in confusion".

Subsequent developments for Freddie Hall 
In September 2016, the Florida Supreme Court vacated Hall's death sentence.

See also 
 Jarvis hearings
 List of United States Supreme Court decisions on capital punishment

References

External links
 

Cruel and Unusual Punishment Clause and death penalty case law
United States disability case law
United States Supreme Court cases
United States Supreme Court cases of the Roberts Court
Capital punishment in Florida
2014 in United States case law